Gerard Hawkins (born 17 January 1961) is an Irish boxer. He competed at the 1980 Summer Olympics and the 1984 Summer Olympics.

References

1961 births
Living people
Irish male boxers
Olympic boxers of Ireland
Boxers at the 1980 Summer Olympics
Boxers at the 1984 Summer Olympics
Place of birth missing (living people)
Light-flyweight boxers